Pompeia (fl. 1st century BC) was the second or third wife of Julius Caesar.

Biography

Early life
Pompeia's parents were Quintus Pompeius Rufus, a son of a former consul, and Cornelia, the daughter of the Roman dictator Sulla.

Marriage
Caesar married Pompeia in 67 BC, after he had served as quaestor in Hispania, his first wife Cornelia having died in 69 BC. Caesar was the nephew of Gaius Marius, and Cornelia was the daughter of Lucius Cornelius Cinna so that they were related to both the leaders of the losing populares side in the civil war of the 80s BC.

In 63 BC Caesar was elected to the position of the Pontifex Maximus, the chief priest of the Roman state religion, which came with an official residence on the Via Sacra. In 62 BC Pompeia hosted the festival of the Bona Dea ("good goddess"), which no man was permitted to attend, in this house. However a young patrician named Publius Clodius Pulcher managed to gain admittance disguised as a woman, apparently for the purpose of seducing Pompeia. He was caught and prosecuted for sacrilege. Caesar gave no evidence against Clodius at his trial, and he was acquitted. Nevertheless, Caesar divorced Pompeia, saying that "my wife ought not even to be under suspicion". This gave rise to a proverb, "Caesar's wife must be above suspicion", meaning that if one is romantically involved with a famous or prominent figure, one must avoid attracting negative attention or scrutiny.

Later life
Nothing specific is known about her life after the divorce, but it has been proposed that she may have married Publius Vatinius.

Cultural depictions 
Pompeia is depicted in various works of fiction including Robert Harris' Lustrum and Colleen McCullough's Masters of Rome series, in the Masters of Rome series the theory that she remarried to Publius is depicted.

See also 
 Pompeia gens
 Caesar's Wife, play named after Pompeia

Notes

References

External links

 
1st-century BC Roman women
1st-century BC Romans
Wives of Julius Caesar